Aundha Naganath is a town in the Aundha Nagnath subdivision of Hingoli district. It lies in the Marathwada region of the Indian state of Maharashtra. The town is known for the Aundha Nagnath Temple, it is the 8th Jyotirling out of 12 which is dedicated to Shiva.  The famous tourist spot along with the Temple includes the beautiful Garden and the Reserved Forest Region on the outskirts of the town.

The town is also famous for the Siddheshwar Dam, which is about 15 km away from the city in the western direction. The proposed site for the Laser Interferometer Gravitational-Wave Observatory (LIGO-India) Project, the research centre to detect Gravitational Waves lies 12 km away from the town. After its scheduled completion in 2024, worldwide this research facility will be the third such facility after Hanford, Washington and Livingston, Louisiana in the USA.

Geography
Aundha Nagnath town rests on the Deccan Trap in the Marathwada Region of Maharashtra.
The Aundha Lake is situated on the southern side is the major source of water for the town.

Demography
As per the 2011 census, Aundha has a total of 2744 families residing. The town has a population of 14801 of which 7515 were males while 7286 were females.
Average Sex Ratio of the town was 970 which is higher than Maharashtra state average of 929.
 The literacy rate of the town was 82.33% compared to 82.34% of Maharashtra. Male literacy stands at 89.45% while the female literacy rate was 74.98%.
Schedule Caste (SC) constitutes 15.57% while Schedule Tribe (ST) were 2.70% of total population.

Transportation

By Air: Aurangabad is the nearest international airport which is about 210 km away from the town. Also, Nanded national airport, which is about 70 km away connects to the town.
By Rail: Chondi station, around 21 km away from the town serves as the nearest railway station. While Hingoli and Parbhani Junctions are well connected throughout the country's major cities such as Mumbai, Hyderabad, Delhi, Chennai, Vijaywada, Kolkata, etc.
By Road: Aundha Nagnath is a major bus stop where all en-route buses halt. This bus stop is well connected to the major cities and regions of Maharashtra. There are daily luxury buses operating to Mumbai, Thane, Kolhapur, Nagpur, Nanded, Aurangabad, Nashik, Akola, Solapur, Latur, etc.

Governance

As per Constitution of India and Panchyati Raj Act, Aundha Nagnath is administrated by NagarAadhakshy (Head of Village) who is elected by the representatives of the village.
The town comes under the Basamath Assembly Constituency for the Assembly Elections of Maharashtra. At present, this constituency is being represented by MLA Rajubhaiya Nawghare, who belongs to the Nationalist Congress Party.
Aundha Nagnath region comes under the Hingoli Parliamentary Constituency for the Parliamentary Elections of India. At present, this constituency is being represented by MP Hemant Patil, who belongs to the Shiv Sena.

Culture
Aundha Nagnath a Hindu culture, form the majority.
Thursday is the day of a weekly market in the Town. On this day, the town witnesses the influx of people from nearby villages to shop around.

Economy
Aundha Nagnath serves as a center of the weekly market of the region. 
It is the market center where agricultural commodities are bought and sold from the agricultural hinterland.
Religious tourism forms one of the important sources of income for the town.

Education
The town has a various educational institution which offers courses in arts, science, and commerce.
The College of Agriculture, Golegaon is one of the best agricultural colleges in the region.

See also

Jawala Bazar

References

Cities and towns in Hingoli district
Talukas in Maharashtra
Hingoli district